Markus Tröger (born 16 April 1966) is a German speed skater. He competed in three events at the 1992 Winter Olympics.

References

External links
 

1966 births
Living people
German male speed skaters
Olympic speed skaters of Germany
Speed skaters at the 1992 Winter Olympics
Sportspeople from Nuremberg